Years of Living Dangerously is an American documentary television series, spread over two seasons, focusing on climate change. The first season, consisting of nine episodes, was broadcast on Showtime in 2014. The second season, consisting of eight episodes, was broadcast on the National Geographic Channel in 2016. Executive producers included James Cameron, Arnold Schwarzenegger, and series creators Joel Bach and David Gelber (formerly of 60 Minutes). Joseph Romm and Heidi Cullen were the chief science advisors. The series won an Emmy Award as Outstanding Documentary or Nonfiction Series.

The weekly episodes featured celebrity hosts with a history of environmental activism and well-known journalists with a background in environmental reportage. These "correspondents" traveled throughout the United States and globally to interview experts and ordinary people affected by, and seeking solutions to, the effects of climate change. The hosts served as reporters and proxies for the audience, asking questions to find out people's opinions and discover the scientific evidence. The final episode of season one featured an interview of President Barack Obama.

Episodes explored the effects of rising sea levels, historic droughts and flooding, water scarcity, ocean acidification, deforestation and the rapidly increasing extinction rate of species, but also focused on "solutions that individuals, communities, companies and even governments can use to address worldwide climate change", including cheaper solar and wind energy, advancing battery technology and electric cars. Hosts included Cameron, Schwarzenegger, Harrison Ford, Ian Somerhalder, America Ferrera, David Letterman, Gisele Bündchen, Jack Black, Matt Damon, Jessica Alba, Sigourney Weaver, and various other actors and journalists.

Schwarzenegger reflected on how the series tries to make the issue of climate change resonate with the public: "I think the environmental movement only can be successful if we are simple and clear and make it a human story. We will tell human stories in this project. The scientists would never get the kind of attention that someone in show business gets." Cameron elaborated: "We didn’t use our celebrities as talking head experts, because they’re not climate experts. They were concerned, intelligent, curious citizens who were out to find answers. They were functioning as journalists." Newsweek said that the celebrity hosts "lend sparks to an issue that sends most viewers for the exits".

Episodes

Season 1 (2014)

Season 2 (2016)

Distribution and schedule

The show premiered on Showtime on April 13, 2014. Episode 1 was made available freely on the internet on April 7, 2014, prior to its television debut. The following episodes aired on April 20 and 27, May 4, 12, 19 and 26, and June 2. Showtime re-aired the entire series in September 2014. Electus International acquired international rights to season one of the series and licensed it to broadcasters in over 75 countries and regions. Season one of the series is available on DVD and other digital platforms. In 2014, the National Wildlife Federation edited the series one episodes to create curricula for schools and colleges

Season 2 premiered on Sunday, October 30, 2016, at 8pm on National Geographic Channel (followed that evening by Before the Flood, Leonardo DiCaprio's climate documentary). The subsequent episodes of season 2 of Years of Living Dangerously aired on Wednesdays at 10 p.m. (9 p.m. Central Time), beginning on November 2. Season 2 consisted of 8 episodes, distributed in 171 countries and 45 languages. The National Geographic Channel is "available in almost 90 million U.S. homes (four times the reach of Showtime) and in over 440 million homes ... worldwide."

Website and advocacy
The series producers maintain a website, https://theyearsproject.com, that contains bonus footage and further information about the stories told in the episodes. It also contains:
 information about, and links to, the science on which the episodes are based;
 an extensive "solutions" page with links to materials about what government, individuals and others can do to stop climate pollution; and
 an educators page, in partnership with the National Wildlife Federation, that links to age-appropriate resources for middle and high school teachers and students, college faculty and students, and parents.

The series' advocacy for climate action includes the #PutAPriceOnIt campaign and a satiric series of "climate inaction figures" representing public officials and private persons who oppose action on climate change.

Reception

Critical reaction
The first season's Metacritic score was 81. The Globe and Mail calls the series "a lavish, gripping production focused on the real effect of climate change in real people's lives around the world." The Yale Forum on Climate Change & The Media noted that the series shows what scientists do in the field "and why they’re reaching the conclusion that this problem is such a serious risk to the viability of our civilization and requires urgent action. ... [The] actors [get] their 'hands dirty'. ... [The show] may ... open new avenues for climate change communications." Skeptical Science terms the series "terrific and powerful. ... The series sets a dramatic, powerful urgent tone." Bryan Walsh of Time magazine wrote that: "it's a strong work of documentary journalism, with richly shot and compelling stories".

Andrew C. Revkin of The New York Times wrote that "the Showtime team, at least in episode one, deserves plaudits for taking a compellingly fresh approach to showing the importance of climate hazards to human affairs ... having the movie and television stars ... asking questions and driving the story through their inquiry." CleanTechnica called the series "powerful" and "compelling", observing that the "often baffling science of climate change, marked by relatively small changes that are often invisible to lay observers, is finally something the larger public can immediately understand here in the format of the finest mainstream cable television. The Sun Herald commented: "The stories are compelling, and were filmed as real news was happening around the participants. A reviewer for The Hollywood Reporter thought: "The documentary does an excellent job of being simple and clear without being arrogant, and its convergence of science, politics, religion and industry proves its ultimate point." The Guardian calls the series "perhaps the most important climate change multimedia communication endeavor in history."

After the DVD and digital release of the series, The New York Times review lamented that "many American households did not have the chance to see Years of Living Dangerously. That is a shame. ... With nine episodes running nearly an hour apiece, "Years" represents a serious time commitment. But that time will be rewarded, because this is the best American television series ever done on climate change."

Viewership
The first episode of season one had 294,000 viewers. The Sunday evening episodes of Years of Living Dangerously, from April 13 to May 4, 2014, had ratings of 0.07%, 0.04%, 0.04% and 0.04% in the adults 18–49 demographic. These figures do not include "on demand" viewers or the viewers who saw the show during Showtime's free weekend, May 9–11, 2014 Season one, episode No. 1, has been viewed more than 890,000 times on YouTube.

Cameron commented that the producers had hoped for higher ratings, but they "braced for less because historically people tend to not tune into something that's environmentally themed or climate change related. ... It's part of the whole denial process that we're all in as a society that we really have to face up to."

Awards and nominations

|-
| rowspan="4" align="center"| 2014
| rowspan="2" align="center"| Primetime Emmy Awards
| Outstanding Documentary or Nonfiction Series
| Years of Living Dangerously (Season 1)
|  (tied with  American Masters)
| rowspan="2" align="center"|
|-
| Outstanding Writing for Nonfiction Programming
| Episode 3: "The Surge"
|  
|-
| align="center"|Environmental Media Awards
| Outstanding Achievement for Environmental Content
| Years of Living Dangerously (Season 1)
| 
| align="center"|
|-
| align="center"|IDA Award
|Best Limited Series
| Years of Living Dangerously (Season 1)
|
|
|-
| align="center"|2015
| align="center"|Cinema for Peace Award
|The International Green Film Award 2015
| Years of Living Dangerously (Season 1)
|
|
|-
| align="center"|2017
| align="center"|Environmental Media Award
| The EMA Outstanding Achievement  for Environmental Content Award
| Years of Living Dangerously (Season 2)
|
|
|-
|}

References

External links 
  – The Years Project
 The Years of Living Dangerously, Season 1 (101-109) and Season 2 (201-208) – The Years Project official YouTube channel (playlist on the right)
 

2010s American documentary television series
2014 American television series debuts
2016 American television series debuts
Showtime (TV network) original programming
National Geographic (American TV channel) original programming
Nature educational television series
Climate change films